Dirdal is a village in Gjesdal municipality in Rogaland county, Norway. The village is located where the Frafjorden joins the main Høgsfjorden. The village lies at the end of the Dirdalen valley, which stretches to the southeast from Dirdal. The village of Gilja lies about  into the valley. Dirdal Church is located in the village.

The valley is connected to the neighboring valley of Frafjord by the Frafjord Tunnel which runs through the mountains and ends at the village of Gilja.

History
Prior to 1 January 1965, the village (and valley) were part of the municipality of Forsand.  This area was moved to Gjesdal because there was no road connection from Dirdal to the rest of Forsand, but there was a road connection to the rest of Gjesdal.

Dirdal was the scene of fierce fighting between Norwegian and German soldiers during Nazi Germany's assault on Norway (Operation Weserübung) in April 1940.

References

Villages in Rogaland
Gjesdal